"Reason Living" is a song by Screen Mode. It is the second opening theme song for Bungo Stray Dogs; a single was released on October 26, 2016. It was composed by Masatomo Ota while the lyrics were provided by Yohei Matsui. The single contains both title song and "Distance". Its short form was first made available on August 28, 2016. It focuses on Atsushi Nakajima's attempts to become a stronger person. The full song can be listened online on Screen Mode's YouTube account. The song was reused in the 2018 film Bungo Stray Dogs: Dead Apple.

Track listing

Chart performance
On the Oricon's Weekly Singles Charts, "Reason Living" peaked at number 64 after being on the charts for 3 weeks. The song was ranked as 9th best theme song by Newtype magazine in 2017.

References

2016 songs